Xavier is a Portuguese surname. Notable people with the surname include:

Abel Xavier (born 1972), Portuguese footballer
Anderson Conceição Xavier (born 1980), Brazilian footballer
Arlene Xavier (born 1969), Brazilian volleyball player
Babi Xavier (born 1974), Brazilian actress, singer and television host
Cleiton Ribeiro Xavier (born 1983), Brazilian footballer
Chica Xavier (1932–2020), Brazilian actress and producer
Chico Xavier (1910–2002), Brazilian medium
Dezmond Xavier (born 1994), American professional wrestler
Emanuel Xavier (born 1971), American author and activist
Filipe Nery Xavier (1801-1875), Goan-Português administrator and historian
St. Francis Xavier (1506–1552, born as Francisco de Jasso y Azpilicueta), Spanish Roman Catholic saint and co-founder of the Jesuit Order
Frederico Burgel Xavier (born 1986), Brazilian footballer
Herve Xavier Zengue known as Xavier (born 1984), Cameroonian footballer
Irene Xavier, Malaysian women's rights activist
Jaime Xavier (born 1990), Brazilian footballer
Jeff Xavier (born 1985), Cape Verdean American basketball player
John Xavier, stage name of American professional wrestler John Jirus
Jorge Barreto Xavier (born 1965), Portuguese cultural manager, university professor, and politician
Leonardo Xavier (born 1976), Brazilian martial artist
Llewellyn Xavier (born 1945), Saint Lucian artist
Marcos Ferreira Xavier (born 1982), Brazilian-Azerbaijani footballer
Margaret Lin Xavier (1898–1932), Thai physician
Nelson Xavier (1941-2017), Brazilian actor
Phideaux Xavier (born 1963), American TV director and musician
S. Xavier (1920-2009), Indian politician

Fictional 
Charles Xavier, founder of The Xavier Institute for Higher Learning

See also
 Javier (disambiguation)
 Javier (name)
 Xavier (given name)

References

Spanish culture
Portuguese-language surnames
Basque-language surnames